The 2019 MAC men's soccer tournament was the 27th and final edition of the MAC Men's Soccer Tournament, a post-season college soccer conference tournament to determine the MAC champion, and the conference's automatic berth into the NCAA Division I men's soccer tournament. The 2019 edition of the tournament began on November 12 and concluded on November 17, 2019.

The lowest seeded team in the tournament, West Virginia, won the MAC title, giving the program their first MAC championship, and their first overall conference championship since 1992. It was the first year since 2011 that a team other than Akron won the MAC Tournament. Marlon LeBlanc earned his first conference championship with the program. With the title, West Virginia earned their second consecutive berth into the NCAA Tournament, and their 14th overall berth. West Virginia defeated Butler 5–1 in the opening round before losing to in-state rivals, Marshall, 1–2.

On May 12, 2020 it was announced that the 2019 edition of the tournament would be the final tournament until at least 2024. From 2020 going forward, the regular season champion would be declared the MAC champion, in part due to the COVID-19 pandemic.

Seeds

Bracket

Schedule

First round

Semifinals

Championship

Statistics

Goalscorers
2 Goals
  Josh DiMatteo – West Virginia

1 Goal

  Albert Andres-Llop – West Virginia
  Jan Maertins – Northern Illinois
  Luke McCormick – West Virginia
  Daniel Nimick – Western Michigan
  Michael Montemurri – Bowling Green
  Paul Liagre – Western Michigan
  Achille Robin – Bowling Green
  Rodrigo Robles Grajera – West Virginia
  Chris Sullivan – Bowling Green

All-Tournament team

References

External links 
 2019 MAC Men's Soccer Tournament Central

2019 NCAA Division I men's soccer season
2019 in sports in Illinois
2019 in sports in Ohio
Mac Men's Soccer Tournament